The 2003 New Progressive Party primaries were the primary elections by which voters of the New Progressive Party (PNP) chose its nominees for various political offices of Puerto Rico, namely the position of governor, for the 2004 general elections. Former Governor Pedro Rosselló was selected as the nominee at the primary elections held on November 9, 2003. He would go on to narrowly lose the 2004 general election against Aníbal Acevedo Vilá, from the Popular Democratic Party (PPD).

Candidates

Governor

 Pedro Rosselló, former Governor of Puerto Rico
 Carlos Pesquera, former candidate to Governor

Resident Commissioner

 Luis Fortuño, former Secretary of Tourism
 Carlos Romero Barceló, former Governor and Resident Commissioner
 Charlie Rodríguez, former President of the Senate of Puerto Rico
 Miriam Ramírez de Ferrer, former Senator

Senate

At-large

 Lucy Arce
 Norma Burgos
 Jorge de Castro Font
 Epifanio
 Tomás Fantauzzi
 José Garriga Picó
 Jaime Irizarry
 Armando Izquierdo

 Kenneth McClintock
 José Enrique Meléndez
 Peter Muller
 Luis Felipe Navas
 Orlando Parga
 Genaro Sánchez
 Jesús Soto Amadeo
 Viruet

District
The New Progressive Party held primaries on all 8 of the senatorial districts.

San Juan
 Roberto Arango
 Donald Cintrón Avilés
 Carlos Díaz
 Danny López

Bayamón
 Pablo LaFontaine
 Migdalia Padilla
 Carmelo Ríos Santiago
 José L. Ortega Rivera

Arecibo
 Calvin
 José Emilio González Velázquez
 Víctor David Loubriel
 Waldemar Quiles

Mayagüez-Aguadilla
 Monica Alpi
 Carlos Arocho
 Luis Daniel Muñiz Cortes
 Michael Nazario
 Armando Nieves Ramos
 Carlos Pagán

Ponce
 Elyod Maldonado Zeda
 María Meléndez
 Delly Mercado Arroyo
 Andrés Rivera
 Luis Armando Rivera
 Linnette Toledo
 Luinel Torres Acosta
 Nilda Vega Santiago

Guayama
 Negroni
 Margarita Nolasco
 Osvaldo Ortolaza Figueroa
 Gerald Quiles Ocasio

Humacao
 Papo Dávila
 Pickie Díaz
 Gabriel Santiago
 Rafael "Rafy" Uceta

Carolina
 José Julio Díaz
 Héctor Martínez Maldonado
 Pablo Ramos
 Lornna Soto

House of Representatives

At-large

José Aponte
Edgar Berríos
José Chico
Rolando Crespo
José Luis Díaz
Rafael Escudero
Jennifer González
Luis Maldonado

Edwin Mundo
Omar Negrón
Lourdes Ramos
Harold Jim Rivera
Iris Miriam Ruíz
Augusto Sánchez
Luis David Valentín

District
The New Progressive Party held primaries on 33 of the 40 representative districts.

District 1
 Junior González
 José "Nuno" López

District 2
 Junior Echevarría
 Diego García Cruz
 William Muriel
 José Serrano

District 3
 Tamara Pérez
 Albita Rivera

District 4
 Anthony
 Liza Fernández
 Julio Lebrón Lamboy

District 5
 Pedro López Santos
 Jorge Navarro Suárez
 Juan Carlos Rodríguez

District 6
 José Marquéz
 Angel Pérez Otero

District 9
 Nelson del Valle
 Angel García
 Annie González
 Juan "Papo" Soto

District 10
 Irma López
 Bernardo Márquez García

District 11
 José de Jesús
 Edwin Ocasio

District 12
 Edward Santiago
 Héctor Torres Calderón
 Víctor

District 13
 Gaby Padilla
 Portalatín
 Gabriel Rodríguez Aguiló

District 14
 Hiram Cruz
 Carlos Molina
 Santos González
 Yamill

District 16
 Gilberto Ramírez Peña
 Iván Rodríguez
 Enrique Ruíz Gerena

District 17
 Ricardo Pitre
 José L. Rivera Guerra
 Wilo Cabán

District 18
 Charlie Arroyo
 Tomás Bonilla Feliciano
 Jorge Cajigas

District 20
 Norman Ramírez Rivera
 Maureen Marchany
 Enobel Santiago

District 21
 Peter Domenech
 Edgardo Irizarry

District 22
 Héctor Luis "Tito" Camacho
 Jorge "Jorgito" Pérez
 Javier Rivera Aquino

District 23
 Juan García Zavála
 Migdalia Irizarry
 Heri Martínez Piña

District 24
 José Alberto Banchs
 John Giménez
 José Moreno
 Wisteria Tejero

District 26
 Arkel
 José Luis Jiménez

District 27
 Carlos Miguel Fuentes
 Juan Soto

District 28
 Miguel Martínez
 Mario Nevárez Rosado
 Erio Quiñones
 Rafael Rivera Ortega

District 29
 Luis Aramburu
 Pedro "Banchy" Cintrón

District 30
 Pablo Bonelli
 Víctor Juan Enriquez
 Jorge "Borgie" Ramos

District 31
 José Ramón Díaz
 Rafael Flores
 José Rivera

District 32
 Arnaldo Báez Neris
 Angel Redondo

District 33
 Denisse
 Angel R. Peña Rosa

District 34
 Cristóbal Colón Ruiz
 Pedro Rodríguez

District 37
 Angel Bulerín
 Elías Rivera

District 38
 Eric Correa
 Raymond Sánchez

District 39
 Chaguito
 Sergio Esteves
 Rafy Reyes

District 40
 Epifanio Jiménez
 Josué David Collazo

Results

The primaries were held on November 9, 2003. In it, Pedro Rosselló comfortably defeated Carlos Pesquera to win the spot for Governor at the 2004 elections. Also, Luis Fortuño defeated Carlos Romero Barceló, Charlie Rodríguez and Miriam Ramírez de Ferrer to win the spot for Resident Commissioner.

Governor

Resident Commissioner

Senate

At-large

House of Representatives

At-large

See also

Popular Democratic Party primaries, 2003

References

Primary elections in Puerto Rico
2003 Puerto Rico elections
New Progressive Party (Puerto Rico)